As White as in Snow (Swedish title: Så vit som en snö) is a Swedish film which was released to cinemas in Sweden on 16 February 2001, directed by Jan Troell. It won three Guldbagge Awards, for best film, best direction and best cinematography, and was nominated for best screenplay.

The screenplay is based on the novel Den ofullbordade himlen by Jacques Werup, which in turn is very loosely inspired by the life of Elsa Andersson, the first woman aviator in Sweden. She is portrayed by Amanda Ooms in the movie. Other key characters are played by Björn Granath, Stina Ekblad, Shanti Roney, Björn Kjellman, Reine Brynolfsson and Rikard Wolff.

The grammatically awkward title (literally translated "As white as a snow") is a quote from a poem/song ("Lejonbruden"), which is performed in the movie.

Cast 
 Amanda Ooms - Elsa Andersson
 Rikard Wolff - Robert Friedman
 Björn Granath - Sven Andersson
 Björn Kjellman - Erik Magnusson
 Stina Ekblad - Stine
 Shanti Roney - Lars Andersson
 Hans Pålsson - Felix Hansson
 Antti Reini - Koivunen
 Reine Brynolfsson - Enoch Thulin
 Maria Heiskanen - Merja

References

External links

2001 films
2000s Swedish-language films
Films based on Swedish novels
Films directed by Jan Troell
Swedish aviation films
Best Film Guldbagge Award winners
Films whose director won the Best Director Guldbagge Award
Biographical films about aviators
2000s Swedish films